Timea Bacsinszky was the defending champion, but lost in the second round to Catherine Bellis.

Anastasia Pavlyuchenkova won the title, defeating Francesca Schiavone in the final, 7–5, 7–5.

This tournament marked the last professional tournament for former top 5 player Daniela Hantuchova.

Seeds

Draw

Finals

Top half

Bottom half

Qualifying

Seeds

Qualifiers

Lucky loser
  Sílvia Soler Espinosa

Draw

First qualifier

Second qualifier

Third qualifier

Fourth qualifier

References 
 Main draw
 Qualifying draw

Grand Prix SAR La Princesse Lalla Meryem Singles
2017 Women's Singles
2017 in Moroccan tennis